Joo Koon MRT station is an above-ground Mass Rapid Transit (MRT) station along the East West Line in Pioneer planning area, Singapore.

Joo Koon station is named after Joo Koon Village, a rural Chinese settlement that once stood in the area before it was turned into an industrial estate in the 1960s. It was the western terminus of the East West line from 28 February 2009 to 18 June 2017, until Tuas Link station was built. Alternate trains terminate at this station during peak hours.

History
Joo Koon station was built together with Pioneer station; they were part of the Boon Lay extension (BLE) project announced by the Land Transport Authority in December 2004 to serve the  Jurong Industrial Estate.

The station opened on 28 February 2009. Installations of half-height platform screen doors began on 16 May 2011 and began operations in July 2012. The station platform was further retrofitted with high-volume low-speed fans, which began operations on 19 August 2012.

Tuas West Extension
On 18 June 2017, Tuas Link station superseded Joo Koon as the western terminus of the East West Line. During the initial opening stage, westbound trains alternated between terminating at both stations.

Incidents

15 November train collision and delay

On 15 November 2017 at approximately 8.18am, 2 C151A trains collided at Joo Koon MRT station. A train fault caused the first train heading in the direction of Tuas Link to stall at the station. A minute later, a second train stopped behind the first and then "moved forward unexpectedly", resulting in the collision. 36 passengers and 2 SMRT staff sustained light to moderate injuries, and were conveyed to Ng Teng Fong General Hospital and National University Hospital. This is the second of such incidents after 5 August 1993, with the first being when 2 C151 trains collided at Clementi.

As a result, train services between Tuas Link and Boon Lay stations were temporarily suspended on both directions for 2 hours on the day itself and for the entire day on 16 November, resulting in westbound trains terminating at Boon Lay station.

An update by the Land Transport Authority (LTA) & SMRT on 16 November stated that LTA and SMRT had decided to isolate for up to one month the operations of the Tuas West Extension, which ran on the new signalling system, from the rest of the east–west line, which ran on the old signalling system, in order to enable LTA and Thales engineers to carry out further assurance checks.

Train service on the Tuas West Extension between Gul Circle and Tuas Link resumed operations on 20 November that year, using the new signalling system. The rest of the East West line continued to run on the old signalling system between Pasir Ris and Joo Koon. However, train services between Joo Koon and Gul Circle were suspended until 27 May 2018, though free bridging bus service was available between the two stations. Continuous service to Tuas Link resumed in stages.

References

External links
 

Railway stations in Singapore opened in 2009
Pioneer, Singapore
Mass Rapid Transit (Singapore) stations